Crocker Reef (or Crocker Ridges) is a coral reef located within the Florida Keys National Marine Sanctuary.  It lies to the southeast of Plantation Key, and is near Davis Reef.  Unlike many reefs in the Sanctuary, it is not within a Sanctuary Preservation Area (SPA).

References

Coral reefs of the Florida Keys